I går såg jag ditt barn, min Fröja (Yesterday saw I your child, my Freya), is a ballad from the Swedish poet and performer Carl Michael Bellman's 1790 collection, Fredman's Epistles, where it is No. 28. The epistle is subtitled "Om et anstäldt försåt emot Ulla Winblad." (About an ambush of Ulla Winblad). It describes an attempt to arrest the "nymph" Ulla Winblad, based on a real event. The lyrics create a rococo picture of life, blending classical allusion and pastoral description with harsh reality.

Context

Song

Music and verse form 

The song has five verses, each of 8 lines. The verses have the alternating rhyming pattern ABAB-CDCD. The music is in  time, and is marked Andante. The melody was reworked by Joseph Martin Kraus from a Languedoc folk tune; it is accompanied throughout by rapid, nervous quavers (eighth notes), giving the Epistle in Edward Matz's view a cinematic slow motion effect. The melody was used by "several parodists" in the 18th century; it had timbres (named melodies) including "Quoi–" and "Ah! ma voisine, es-tu fâchée?" which the musicologist James Massengale suggests Bellman may have had in mind.

Lyrics 

The song is dated 17 August 1771.
The epistle is subtitled "Om et anstäldt försåt emot Ulla Winblad" ("About an attempted ambush of Ulla Winblad"), which Bellman's biographer Lars Lönnroth describes as relatively vague, compared for instance to that of epistle 31, which gives exact co-ordinates in time and space. The story is at least loosely based on a real event, although the real Ulla Winblad, Maria Kristina Kiellström, was neither a prostitute nor a barmaid, and never prosecuted for wearing unauthorised finery in the form of silk dresses.

Reception 

Bellman's biographer, Paul Britten Austin, describes the Epistle as rococo, along with No. 25: Blåsen nu alla (All blow now). In it, Ulla Winblad, "a luxuriant Venus, incarnation of love and beauty" is almost caught by the bailiffs in Yxsmedsgränd, a narrow street in Stockholm's Gamla stan, where Bellman himself lived from 1770 to 1774. Carina Burman, in her biography of Bellman, wonders whether Bellman found it slightly amusing to move into the street where the bailiffs had pursued Ulla sixteen years earlier. The epistle describes how she just manages to escape. Bellman simultaneously uses classical and contemporary imagery. He calls Ulla a nymph; she has been given a "myrtle" (crown of leaves) by Freya, the Nordic goddess of love; the Bonde Palace (visible from the corner of Yxsmedsgränd) is called the temple of Themis, classical goddess of justice; and Freya is to be worshipped in Paphos' land, equating her with Venus/Aphrodite. Paphos in Cyprus was where, in the myth, Aphrodite rose naked from the foaming sea, and her temple is nearby. But, non-mythologically, Ulla wears "a black embroider'd bodice" and petticoats with "frills and laces", and she loses her watch in the struggle. Britten Austin translates the entire Epistle.

Burman notes that the cheerful last stanza of the Epistle was one of the Bellman songs used in 19th century student celebrations. Epistle 28 has been recorded by Cornelis Vreeswijk, a noted Bellman interpreter, on his 1971 studio album Spring mot Ulla, spring! Cornelis sjunger Bellman, among others.

References

Sources

 
 
 
 
  (contains the most popular Epistles and Songs, in Swedish, with sheet music)
  (with facsimiles of sheet music from first editions in 1790, 1791)

External links 

 Text of Epistle 28
 Live 2020 studio recording of 'Bellman 2.0' theatre concert (song starts at 23:00) at Västmanlands Teater by Nikolaj Cederholm and Kåre Bjerkø with their band

1790 compositions 
Swedish songs
Fredmans epistlar